Milt Jackson at the Museum of Modern Art is a live album by vibraphonist Milt Jackson recorded in 1965 at the Museum of Modern Art and released on the Limelight label.

Reception
The Allmusic review by Thom Jurek awarded the album 3 stars stating "This date is red hot for any fan who lives for jazz with rhythm, swing, and soul in equal tonnage".

Track listing
All compositions by Milt Jackson except as indicated
 "The Quota" (Jimmy Heath) - 4:32   
 "Novamo" - 5:45   
 "Enigma" (J. J. Johnson) - 3:40   
 "Turquoise" (Cedar Walton) - 5:15   
 "Chyrise" - 3:20   
 "Montelei" - 4:45   
 "Simplicity & Beauty" (James Moody) - 2:44   
 "Flying Saucer" (Moody) - 5:00   
 "Namesake" - 4:12
Recorded at The Museum of Modern Art in New York City on August 12, 1965

Personnel
Milt Jackson – vibes
James Moody - flute, vocals
Cedar Walton - piano
Ron Carter - bass
Otis "Candy" Finch - drums

References 

Limelight Records albums
Milt Jackson albums
1965 live albums
Albums recorded at the Museum of Modern Art